Henry Rowe may refer to:

Henry Rowe (Lord Mayor) (died 1612), English merchant
Henry S. Rowe (1851–1914), American businessman and politician
Henry Rowe (architect) (1812–1870), Irish architect
Henry Rowe (lawyer) (1916–1992), Austrian-born British lawyer and parliamentary draftsman

See also
Harry Rowe (disambiguation)